János Tornyai (January 18, 1869 – September 20, 1936) was a renowned Hungarian painter born in Hódmezővásárhely.

Early life
Tornyai, the son of day labourers, studied at the School of Decorative Art in 1886–1888, then a guest pupil of Bertalan Székely, Károly Lotz and János Greguss in 1888–89. He studied at the Académie Julian in Paris from 1894 where he was influenced by Mihály Munkácsy's art. He visited Germany and Italy in 1897, then returned to Hódmezővásárhely.

He had hardly enough to keep body and soul together, and had a studio from 1903 only. He lived in Mártély from the 1910s onwards where he painted a series of landscapes on the Great Plain. He moved to Budapest in 1919. He worked in Szentendre for a few months in 1933–34.

First he was Munkácsy's follower in portraying peasants' lives. His major works from this period "Rákóczi in Rodostó", 1904, "The Outlaw's Love", 1907, and "Miklós Nagy Bercsényi", 1908. "Heritage" inspired him to paint landscapes with delicate colours ("Well-Sweep", "Hungarian Fate", etc.). In his late Szentendre period, colours became lighter and he was engaged in plein air ("Woman in Green Coat", 1932–34, etc.).

He became interested in the Great Plain around 1904 and from then on he made several pictures of farmsteads with violent brushwork and sweeping style. Hódmezővásárhely was the place he always returned to after his journeys to Budapest, Paris and Szentendre, and he spent his last years nearby, in Mártély; very peaceful and productive years. In 1984, 718 pictures were found under the floor of his studio. Now these pictures are in the Tornyai Museum of Hódmezővásárhely.

Gallery

Realistic style

Landscapes

Post-Nagybánya style

References

 XIX-XX. century Hungarian painting. Ed. Ibos Éva. Transl. Havasi Máté. Kisújszállás : Pannon-Literatúra Kft., 2007. János Tornyai see 94–95. p.

External links
ArtNet Entry
 Biography

1869 births
1936 deaths
People from Hódmezővásárhely
19th-century Hungarian painters
20th-century Hungarian painters
Hungarian male painters
19th-century Hungarian male artists
20th-century Hungarian male artists